The discography of Estonian singer-songwriter Kerli consists of two studio albums, three extended plays (EPs), sixteen singles and fifteen music videos. Kerli signed a record deal with Island Records in 2006 and released in July 2008 her debut album Love Is Dead, which peaked at number 126 on the Billboard 200 chart in the United States. The album's lead single "Walking on Air" reached the top 40 of European territories such as Austria, Germany, Italy and Switzerland, resulting in its summit at number seventy-five on the European Hot 100 Singles.

In 2010, Kerli's "Tea Party" was a single from the Alice in Wonderland film inspired soundtrack Almost Alice. After the singles "Army of Love" (2011) and "Zero Gravity" (2012)—which peaked at number one and six on the U.S. Hot Dance Club Songs, respectively—her second EP, originally intended to be a full studio album, Utopia, was released in March 2013, with "The Lucky Ones" released as its lead single. Kerli's second studio album, Shadow Works, was released in 2019.

Studio albums

Extended plays

Singles

As lead artist

As a featured artist

Promotional singles

Guest appearances

Music videos

Songwriting credits

Footnotes

References

External links
 Discography of Kerli at Allmusic. Rovi Corporation.

K
K